Sovetskaya is a station of the Samara Metro on First Line which was opened on 31 December 1992.

Samara Metro stations
Railway stations in Russia opened in 1992
Railway stations located underground in Russia